Cristina Scuccia (born 19 August 1988) is an Italian singer who won the 2014 season of The Voice of Italy as part of Team J-Ax, resulting in a record deal with Universal. In 2013, she won a Christian music competition as part of the Good News Festival.

Early life
Cristina Scuccia was born in Vittoria in 1988.  She became a novice in 2009 and worked for two years with poor children in Brazil before formally joining the Ursuline order. In the years from 2009 to 2011, Sister Cristina improved her artistic skills at the "Star Rose Academy" in Rome, created and directed by Maximo De Marco. Her singing teacher was the singer-songwriter Franco Simone.
Her television debut was in June 2012, on the program "Dizionario dei sentimenti" by Franco Simone, on Gold Tv in Rome.

Career

2014–present

The Voice of Italy
In 2014, Scuccia applied to The Voice of Italy singing competition, singing for her audition "No One" by Alicia Keys. The performance received more than 104 million views on YouTube. She was very popular with the audience and all four judges—Raffaella Carrà, J-Ax, Noemi, and Piero Pelù—turned their chairs in the blind audition. Cristina chose to be part of Team J-Ax. Throughout the contest, she wore a simple crucifix around her neck, black shoes and ankle-length black religious habit. During the show, she sang "The Cup of Life" alongside Ricky Martin and during the final, she sang a duet with Kylie Minogue on "Can't Get You Out of My Head". In the final, she won the trophy with 62% of the Italian votes against runner-up Giacomo Voli. After winning, she thanked God and recited the Lord's Prayer to the show organizers and audience.

On November 20, 2022, she was a guest on the Italian program "Verissimo" by Silvia Toffanin, in which she announced few that she had given up her perpetual vows to be able to devote herself full-time to a musical career.
Performances
Blind audition (19 March 2014): "No One" by Alicia Keys. All four chairs turned.
Battle round (16 April 2014): "Girls Just Want to Have Fun" by Cyndi Lauper. Advanced against Luna Palumbo of Team J-Ax.
Knock out round (24 April 2014): "Hero" by Mariah Carey. Advanced against Benedetta Giovagnini of Team J-Ax.
Live show 1 (7 May 2014): "Flashdance... What a Feeling" by Irene Cara. Saved by public vote.
Live show 2 (14 May 2014): "Uno su mille" by Gianni Morandi. Saved by public vote.
Live show 3 (21 May 2014): "Livin' on a Prayer" by Bon Jovi. Saved by public vote.
Semi-final (28 May 2014): "(I've Had) The Time of My Life" by Bill Medley and Jennifer Warnes. 45/100 from coach and 70.18/100 from voting public. Advanced to final. Dylan Magon from Team J-Ax eliminated.
Final (5 June 2014) singing:
Phase one (Final 4):
"Beautiful That Way" by Achinoam Nini.
"Gli anni" by 883 in duet with coach J-Ax.
"Lungo la riva" (new song). Advanced with Giacomo Voli and Tommaso Pini. Giorgia Pino eliminated.
Phase 2 (Final 3):
"No One" by Alicia Keys. Advanced to Final 2 with Giacomo Voli. Tommaso Pini eliminated.
Phase 3 (Final 2)
"Flashdance... What a Feeling" from Irene Cara. Won The Voice title with 62.30% of the vote. Finalist Giacomo Voli runner up for season.

Album and video
On 20 October 2014, the music video for Scuccia's version of Madonna's "Like a Virgin" was released on Vevo platform. It is the lead single from her debut album Sister Cristina which was released on 11 November 2014. The album contains her interpretations of a number of songs as well as two previously unreleased songs.

On 18 December 2014, she released her second music video "Blessed Be Your Name".

Acting career
In 2015, Scuccia was cast as Sister Mary Robert in the Italian production of the Sister Act musical.

Discography

Albums

Singles

References

1988 births
21st-century Italian Roman Catholic religious sisters and nuns
English-language singers from Italy
Living people
Italian expatriates in Brazil
The Voice (franchise) winners
People from Comiso
Universal Music Group artists
Italian pop singers
Italian rock singers
21st-century Italian singers
21st-century Italian women singers
Musicians from the Province of Ragusa
21st-century Italian actresses